Casa de España is the headquarters of a private social organization whose members are those of Spanish descent in San Juan, Puerto Rico on Avenida de La Constitución in Old San Juan.

History
The building was designed in a Moorish Revival style by architect Pedro Adolfo de Castro.  The building dates from 1934. Although it is named "Casa", it has never been a dwelling place for a family; rather it is a "house" whose members claim common ancestry. It was listed on the National Register of Historic Places in 1983.  It is not open to the public, but private affairs may be arranged.

The fountain one first encounters upon approach is a copy of one in the "Patio de los Leones" at La Alhambra in Granada, Spain.

The interior courtyard was used to film two coronation scenes for the Disney Channel Original Movie "Princess Protection Program" (2008).

Gallery

See also
Centro Español de Ponce

References

External links

Cultural infrastructure completed in 1934
Clubhouses on the National Register of Historic Places in Puerto Rico
Moorish Revival architecture in Puerto Rico
1934 establishments in Puerto Rico
National Register of Historic Places in San Juan, Puerto Rico